William H. Goldthorpe (September 25, 1880 – June 1, 1964) was an American newspaper publisher, postmaster, and politician who served as a member of the Wisconsin State Assembly.

Biography
Goldthorpe was born on September 25, 1880 in Cobb, Wisconsin. He graduated from the University of Wisconsin–Platteville in 1900. During his time there, he organized the school band. Goldthorpe was a publisher of the Tri-Country Press and was president of the board of education.

Goldthorpe was a member of the Wisconsin State Assembly from 1935 to 1946. Additionally, he served as the postmaster of Cuba City, Wisconsin. He was a Republican.

He died on June 1, 1964 in Cuba City, Wisconsin.

References

External links
The Political Graveyard

People from Iowa County, Wisconsin
People from Cuba City, Wisconsin
School board members in Wisconsin
Republican Party members of the Wisconsin State Assembly
Wisconsin postmasters
University of Wisconsin–Platteville alumni
1880 births
1964 deaths
20th-century American politicians
20th-century American newspaper publishers (people)